

New Zealand

 History of New Zealand
 Politics of New Zealand
 Geography of New Zealand
 Economy of New Zealand
 Demographics of New Zealand
 Culture of New Zealand
 Pākehā
 Māori
 New Zealand English
 Cinema of New Zealand
 New Zealand literature
 Music of New Zealand
 Sport in New Zealand
 Lists of New Zealanders

History

Timeline of New Zealand history
Natural history of New Zealand
Archaeology of New Zealand
Māori history
Independence of New Zealand
First voyage of James Cook
New Zealand Wars
Timeline of New Zealand's links with Antarctica
List of years in New Zealand

Settlement and early history

Treaty of Waitangi
Colony of New Zealand
Declaration of the Independence of New Zealand
Musket Wars
Provinces of New Zealand

Twentieth-century history

Dominion of New Zealand
Realm of New Zealand
Military history of New Zealand
New Zealand nuclear-free zone
Sinking of the Rainbow Warrior
Māori protest movement
Air New Zealand Flight 901
1981 South Africa rugby union tour of New Zealand
Rogernomics

Historical figures

James Cook
William Hobson
Hongi Hika
James Mckenzie
George Grey
Kate Sheppard
Michael Joseph Savage
Robert Muldoon
David Lange
Keith Park
Edmund Hillary

Government and politics

Executive

Cabinet of New Zealand

Parliament
New Zealand Parliament
New Zealand House of Representatives

Elections

New Zealand electorates
List of New Zealand by-elections
Electoral reform in New Zealand
Royal Commission on the Electoral System
Electoral Commission (New Zealand)

Political parties

 New Zealand Labour Party
 New Zealand National Party
 Green Party of Aotearoa New Zealand
 ACT New Zealand
 New Zealand First
 Māori Party
 Social Credit Party (New Zealand)

Office holders

Queen of New Zealand
Governor-General of New Zealand
Prime Minister of New Zealand
Deputy Prime Minister of New Zealand
Speaker of the House of Representatives
Leader of the Opposition
List of ambassadors from New Zealand to other countries

Military

New Zealand Army
Royal New Zealand Air Force
Royal New Zealand Navy
Air Force Museum of New Zealand
New Zealand Special Air Service
Royal New Zealand Infantry Regiment
Māori Battalion
History of the Royal New Zealand Navy
Royal New Zealand Navy plans

Law and law enforcement

Supreme Court of New Zealand
Chief Justice of New Zealand
High Court of New Zealand
Environment Court of New Zealand
New Zealand Bill of Rights Act 1990
New Zealand Police
Capital punishment in New Zealand
Principles of the Treaty of Waitangi
Resource Management Act 1991

Overseas territories

Cook Islands
Niue
Tokelau
Chatham Islands
Kermadec Islands
Ross Dependency
New Zealand Subantarctic Islands

Other articles

Climate change in New Zealand
Foreign relations of New Zealand
Republicanism in New Zealand
Resource Management Act 1991

Geography and geology

Climate of New Zealand

Islands

North Island
South Island
Stewart Island/Rakiura
Waiheke Island
Chatham Islands
Great Barrier Island/Aotea
Kapiti Island
Whakaari / White Island
Rangitoto Island

Regions

 Northland
 Auckland
 Waikato
 Bay of Plenty
 Gisborne
 Hawke's Bay
 Taranaki region
 Manawatu-Wanganui region
 Wellington
 Marlborough
 Nelson
 Tasman
 West Coast
 Canterbury
 Otago
 Southland
 Chatham Islands

Main centres

 Whangarei
 Auckland (largest city)
 Hamilton
 Tauranga
 Rotorua
 Gisborne
 Napier
 Hastings
 New Plymouth
 Whanganui
 Palmerston North
 Wellington (capital city)
 Nelson
 Christchurch
 Timaru
 Queenstown
 Dunedin
 Invercargill

Lakes and rivers

 Lake Rotorua
 Lake Taupo
 Lake Benmore
 Lake Dunstan
 Lake Wakatipu
 Lake Wanaka
 Lake Manapouri
 Lake Te Anau
 Waikato River
 Clutha River
 Shotover River
 Whanganui River
 Waitaki River

Hills and mountains

Aoraki / Mount Cook
One Tree Hill
Mount Herbert / Te Ahu Patiki
Mount Aspiring / Tititea
Mount Taranaki / Egmont
Mount Ruapehu
Mitre Peak
Mount Sefton
Mount Tasman
Southern Alps

Volcanism and earthquakes
List of earthquakes in New Zealand
Volcanism of New Zealand

Ecology and environment

Plants

Kauri (Agathis australis)
Totara (Podocarpus totara)
New Zealand Tree Fern (Dicksonia squarrosa)
Silver fern (Cyathea dealbata)
Rimu (Dacrydium cupressinum)
Cordyline australis (Cabbage tree)

Animals

Invasive species in New Zealand
List of extinct animals of New Zealand
List of birds of New Zealand
Kiwi
Tuatara
Wētā

National parks

Fiordland National Park
Aoraki / Mount Cook National Park
Rakiura National Park
Tongariro National Park

Economy

Companies

Telecom New Zealand
Air New Zealand
SkyCity
Auckland Airport
Carter Holt Harvey
Contact Energy
Fletcher Building
Fisher & Paykel
Sky Television

Tourism

Tolkien tourism

Culture

Literary

Once Were Warriors
Katherine Mansfield

Arts

 New Zealand art
 Photography in New Zealand

Music

 Kiri Te Kanawa
 Split Enz
 Neil Finn
 Lorde
Jemaine Clement
Bret McKenzie
The Brunettes
Shihad

Movies

The Piano
Heavenly Creatures
Once Were Warriors (film)
Whale Rider
Eagle vs Shark
Goodbye Pork Pie
Bad Taste
The Price of Milk
Sione's Wedding
The Lord of the Rings
King Kong (2005 film)
The Navigator: A Medieval Odyssey
River Queen

Architecture
Buildings and structures in New Zealand
William Alington (architect)

Sports

Association football in New Zealand
Australian rules football in New Zealand
Caving in New Zealand
Cricket in New Zealand
Thoroughbred racing in New Zealand
Dirt track racing in New Zealand
Netball in New Zealand
Rugby league in New Zealand
Rugby union in New Zealand
Skiing in New Zealand
Sport New Zealand
New Zealand at the Olympics
Tramping in New Zealand

Mass media
List of free-to-air channels in New Zealand
List of print media in New Zealand

Television

Shortland Street
Flight of the Conchords
Outrageous Fortune (TV series)

Society
Social class in New Zealand
Prostitution in New Zealand

Health

COVID-19 pandemic in New Zealand
HIV/AIDS in New Zealand
McKenzie method

Food and drink
 New Zealand cuisine
 Alcohol in New Zealand

Celebrities

 Peter Jackson
 Lorde
 Sam Neill
 Taika Waititi
 Karl Urban
 Jemaine Clement

Māori

Haka
Iwi
Māori culture
Māori language
Māori music
Māori mythology
Māori politics
Māori religion
Māori Television
Marae
Waka

Travel and communications

Roads

New Zealand state highway network
Transit New Zealand
New Zealand State Highway 1
List of motorways and expressways
Central Motorway Junction
Queen Street, Auckland
Great South Road
Transmission Gully Motorway
Lambton Quay

Ports

Auckland
Napier
Wellington
Picton
Bluff
Lyttelton
Port Chalmers

Rail

List of railway lines in New Zealand
List of New Zealand railway museums and heritage lines
List of Auckland railway stations
List of Wellington railway stations
Locomotives of New Zealand
New Zealand Railways Corporation
New Zealand Railways Department
KiwiRail
Taieri Gorge Railway
Toll New Zealand
Tranz Metro
Tranz Rail
KiwiRail Scenic Journeys
Transdev Auckland

Air travel

List of airports in New Zealand
List of airlines of New Zealand
List of busiest airports in New Zealand
Air New Zealand
Air New Zealand Flight 901
Royal New Zealand Air Force

Education and science

Universities

Auckland University of Technology
Lincoln University
Massey University
University of Auckland
University of Canterbury
University of Otago
University of Waikato
Victoria University of Wellington
University of New Zealand (dissolved in 1961 )

Schools

Science in New Zealand

Scientists

 Ernest Rutherford
 Alan MacDiarmid
 Archibald McIndoe
 Maurice Wilkins
 Vaughan Jones
 Brian Barratt-Boyes
 Neil Cherry
 Beatrice Tinsley
 William Hayward Pickering

Lists

 List of New Zealanders
 List of disasters in New Zealand by death toll
 List of museums in New Zealand

See also

Outline of New Zealand
Lists of country-related topics – similar lists for other countries

 
Outlines of countries